Hartmut Schelter (born 22 May 1943) is a German sprinter. He competed in the men's 100 metres at the 1968 Summer Olympics representing East Germany.

References

1943 births
Living people
Athletes (track and field) at the 1968 Summer Olympics
German male sprinters
Olympic athletes of East Germany
Place of birth missing (living people)